Nogersund is a locality situated in Sölvesborg Municipality, Blekinge County, Sweden with 495 inhabitants in 2010.

References 

Populated places in Sölvesborg Municipality